The Graham-Perren Racer, or Graham-Perren Monoplane, was a racing aircraft built to compete in the 1934 National Air Races, including the Greve Trophy.

Design and development
The racer was a short-coupled, wire braced, mid-winged aircraft with fixed conventional landing gear and an open cockpit. The  Wright Gipsy engine protruded upward through the cowl leaving little forward visibility.

Specifications (Graham-Perren Racer)

See also

References

Racing aircraft
Mid-wing aircraft
Single-engined tractor aircraft